Dotson Ice Shelf is an ice shelf about  wide between Martin Peninsula and Bear Peninsula on the coast of Marie Byrd Land in Antarctica. It was first mapped by the U.S. Geological Survey from air photos obtained by U.S. Navy Operation Highjump in January 1947, and was named by the Advisory Committee on Antarctic Names for Lieutenant William A. Dotson, US Navy, formerly Officer in Charge of the Ice Reconnaissance Unit of the Naval Oceanographic Office, killed in a plane crash in Alaska in November 1964 while on an ice reconnaissance mission.

See also
 List of glaciers
 List of Antarctic ice shelves

Further reading 
 David A. Lilien, Ian Joughin, Benjamin Smith, and David E. Shean, Changes in flow of Crosson and Dotson ice shelves, West Antarctica, in response to elevated melt, The Cryosphere, 12, 1415–1431, 2018 https://doi.org/10.5194/tc-12-1415-2018
 Goldberg, D. N., Gourmelen, N., Kimura, S., Millan, R., & Snow, K., How Accurately Should We Model Ice Shelf Melt Rates? , Geophysical Research Letters, 46, 189–199. https://doi.org/10.1029/2018GL080383

References 

Ice shelves of Antarctica
Bodies of ice of Marie Byrd Land